The Ha. 62-76 Japanese Midget Submarine, is located in front of the T. Stell Newman Visitor Center 1657-B, Santa Rita, Guam, was built in 1944.  It is a  built by Ōurazaki, Kure.  It was captured during World War II, after it ran aground on Togcha Beach, near Ipan Talofofo, Guam, in 1944.  Its crew surrendered three days later.

It was listed on the U.S. National Register of Historic Places in 1999.  It is of a model of submarine deployed in the later part of World War II;  its advantage over "Type A" Kō-hyōteki-class submarine  is that it had a diesel generator that extended its range of operations.  There were apparently only fifteen "Type C" submarines ever built;  this is the only known surviving example.  Its insides were cleaned out by the Navy before it was placed on display at "old Camp Dealy" on Togcha Bay, Guam.  It was moved to Naval Station, Guam, in 1952. It is located at the T. Stell Newman Visitor Center, a part of the National Park Service, War in the Pacific, National Historical Park Guam, just outside the Naval Base.

See also
HA. 19 (Japanese Midget Submarine), surrendered in Hawaii

References

External links

World War II on the National Register of Historic Places in Guam
Type A Ko-hyoteki-class submarines
World War II submarines of Japan
Museum ships in the United States
Santa Rita, Guam
Ships built by Kure Naval Arsenal